The Bricklayers is a 1976 Mexican drama film directed by Jorge Fons. It was entered into the 27th Berlin International Film Festival where it won the Silver Bear.

Cast
 Ignacio López Tarso - Don Jesús
 Jaime Fernández - Pérez Gómez
 José Alonso - Federico
 Salvador Sánchez - Chapo Álvarez
 José Carlos Ruiz - Jacinto Martínez
 Katy Jurado - Josefina
 Adalberto Martínez - Patotas
 Salvador Garcini - Sergio García
 José Luis Flores - Isidro
 Yara Patricia - Celerina (as Yara Patricia Palomino)
 Eduardo Cassab - Munguía
 Guillermo Gil - Valverde
 Ramón Menéndez - Policía Dávila
 Yolanda Rigel - Secretaria
 Gerardo Zepeda - Marcial
 Mario García González - Delegado

References

External links

1976 films
1970s Spanish-language films
1976 drama films
Films directed by Jorge Fons
Mexican drama films
1970s Mexican films